The Chu (Shu or Chüy) (شۋ; , چۉي;  (from , Chǔ)) is a river in Northern Kyrgyzstan and Southern Kazakhstan. It is one of the longest rivers in Kyrgyzstan and in Kazakhstan.

The Chüy Region, the northernmost and most populous administrative region of Kyrgyzstan, is named after the river; so are Chüy Avenue, the main street of Bishkek and the city of Shu in Kazakhstan's Jambyl Region.

Course
The Chu is formed by the confluence of the rivers Joon Aryk and Kochkor, in the Kochkor District of the Naryn Region. After approaching within a few kilometres of Lake Issyk-Kul (near Balykchy), without either flowing into the lake or draining it, it turns towards the northwest. In the 1950s an old riverbed called Ketmaldy (also Buugan) linked the Chu River and Issyk Kul. During floods part of Chu water would reach the lake, but such outflow has not been seen since the construction of the Orto-Tokoy Reservoir. After passing through the narrow Boom Gorge (Boomskoye ushchelye), the river enters the comparatively flat Chüy Valley, within which lie the Kyrgyz capital of Bishkek and the Kazakh city of Shu. Much of the Chu's water is diverted into a network of canals, such as the Great Chüy Canal, to irrigate the fertile black soils of the Chüy Valley for farming, on both the Kyrgyz and Kazakh sides of the river.

As the Chu flows through the Chüy Valley, it forms the border between Kyrgyzstan and Kazakhstan for more than a hundred kilometres, but then it leaves Kyrgyzstan and flows into Kazakhstan, where it flows at the northern edge of the Moiynkum Desert, with lake Kokuydynkol close to its channel . In wet years it may reach the drainless salt lake Akzhaykyn, located among the vast solonchaks of the Ashchykol Depression.

History

The area of this river was originally home to the Iranian Sughds who spoke Soghdian, an East Iranian language.

During the Middle Ages, the area was strategically important. It was the setting of Suyab, the capital of the Western Turkic Khaganate and Balasagun, the capital of the Qara Khitai (Western Liao dynasty).

The Chu River posed a risk of flooding for settlements located in the Chu Valley. In the winter of 1878, an ice gorge formed on the Chu River upstream from Tokmok, the administrative centre of Semirechye Province. This was followed by severe flooding that damaged the town and the province's capital was moved to Pishpek (Bishkek).

Dams
The river flow is regulated by the dam at Orto-Tokoy Reservoir in Kyrgyzstan built in 1957 and the dam at Tasotkel Reservoir in Kazakhstan built in 1974.

Ecology and environment

Environmental monitoring
The Kyrgyz State Agency for Hydrometeorology and the Kazakhstan Hydrometeorological Service (Kazhydromet) operate a number of water quality monitoring stations on the Chu River and its tributaries.

Water quality
According to the Kyrgyz State Agency for Hydrometeorology, in 2004–08 the water pollution index of the Chu River in the Chu Valley ranged from 0.25 to 0.7 units, which is interpreted as Class II ("Clean water"). The only exception was a monitoring point downstream of Vasilyevka village where the water pollution index ranged from 0.4 to 1.2 units and water quality was assessed as Class II(Clean)/Class III ("Moderately polluted").

According to the Kazakhstan Hydrometeorological Service (Kazhydromet), the water pollution index of the Shu (Chu) River in the Jambyl Region of Kazakhstan amounted to 2.01 (Class III, "Moderately polluted") in 2008, and 1.83 (Class III, "Moderately polluted") in 2009. Such water quality parameters as biochemical oxygen demand, nitrites, copper, and phenols exceeded the maximum allowable concentrations.

Major tributaries
In Kyrgyzstan, 4892 rivers and canals flow into Chu River. The main tributaries are, from source to mouth:
 Kochkor (left)
 Joon Aryk (right)
 Chong-Kemin (right)
 Kichi-Kemin (right)
 Kara-Konguz (right)
 Shamshy (left)
 Ysyk-Ata (left)
 Alamüdün (left)
 Ala-Archa (left)
 Jylamysh (left)
 Kakpatas (right)
 Ak-Suu (left)
 Kuragaty (left)

Gallery

See also
Chu-Ili Range

References